Ryanville is a populated place in Harrison County, West Virginia, United States.

See also
Bridgeport, West Virginia

References

Geography of Harrison County, West Virginia